Rhabdophis guangdongensis, commonly known as the Guangdong keelback, is a keelback snake in the family Colubridae. It is endemic to Guangdong, southern China.

References

Rhabdophis
Snakes of China
Endemic fauna of China
Reptiles described in 2014
Taxa named by Zhao Ermi